Revolución Libertadora (Liberating Revolution) was the coup d'état that ended the second presidential term of Juan Perón in Argentina, on 16 September 1955.

Background

President Perón was first elected in 1946. In 1949, a constitutional amendment sponsored by Peronism introduced a number of workers' rights and the possibility of presidential reelection. The legitimacy of the new constitution is still controversial. Perón was reelected in 1951. At the time, his administration was widely supported by the labor unions, the military and the Catholic Church.

However, economic problems, some of the government's policies, and Perón's own personality cult changed this situation. The opposition criticized Perón because of his treatment of dissidents. (Writers, artists, politicians and other intellectuals were harassed and sometimes were forced into exile.) The government's relationship with the Catholic Church also worsened. As the Church increasingly distanced itself from Perón, the government, which had first respected the Church's privileges, now took them away in a distinctly confrontational fashion. By 1954, the Catholic clergy was openly anti-Peronist, which also influenced some factions of the military. Meanwhile, a Christian Democratic Party was founded in 1954 after several other organisations had been active promoting Christian democracy in Argentina.

By 1955, Perón had lost the support of a large part of the military, who conspired with other political actors (members of the Radical Civic Union and the Socialist Party, as well as conservative groups). There was turmoil in different parts of the country. On 14 June, Catholic bishops spoke against Perón during a Corpus Christi procession which turned into an anti-government demonstration.

Military uprising

First coup attempt 

On 16 June 1955, 30 Argentine Navy and Air Force aircraft bombed Plaza de Mayo, Buenos Aires' main square, killing over 300 civilians and wounding hundreds more. The attack remains to this day the largest aerial bombing ever executed on the Argentine mainland. The bombing targeted the adjacent Casa Rosada, the official seat of government, as a large crowd was gathered there expressing support for president Juan Perón. The strike took place during a day of official public demonstrations to condemn the burning of a national flag allegedly carried out by detractors of Perón during the recent procession of Corpus Christi.

In retaliation, extremist Peronist groups attacked and burned several churches that night, allegedly instigated by Vice-President Alberto Teisaire.

The only important political support for Perón came from the General Confederation of Labour (the main confederation of labor unions), which called the workers to defend the president. Perón addressed a workers' demonstration on 31 August.

September uprising 
On 16 September, a new uprising, led by General Eduardo Lonardi, General Pedro E. Aramburu and Admiral Isaac Rojas, deposed Perón and established a provisional government. For several days, there was some fighting in places like the city of Córdoba (Lonardi's central command), the Puerto Belgrano Naval Base near Bahía Blanca, another naval base at Río Santiago, near La Plata, and a mechanized infantry regiment at Curuzú Cuatiá, Corrientes Province. The rebellion in Corrientes, which was initially defeated, was led by Pedro Eugenio Aramburu, who later became one of the main players of the future government. Two rebel destroyers, that were enforcing the blockade of the Río de la Plata, were strafed by loyalist aircraft and suffered some casualties. The port and the army garrison at Mar del Plata was subjected to naval bombardment on 19 September by the light cruiser ARA 9 de Julio and several destroyers, while scattered skirmishes and air strikes took place elsewhere, including Buenos Aires itself.

After realizing that the country was on the brink of a civil war, Perón decided to avoid massive bloodshed and resigned as President, subsequently seeking asylum in Paraguay after taking shelter aboard the Paraguay gunboat.

On 23 September, Lonardi assumed the presidency and gave a conciliatory speech from the balcony of the Casa Rosada, saying that there would be "neither victors nor vanquished" (ni vencedores ni vencidos, replaying a phrase uttered by Urquiza when he was victorious over Rosas at the Battle of Caseros).  General Lonardi promised that the interim administration would end as soon as the country was "reorganized". His conciliatory tone earned him the opposition of hard-liners, and in November an internal coup deposed Lonardi and placed General Aramburu in the presidency, giving rise to a wild "anti-Peronism".

Aftermath 

After the Revolución Libertadora, Perón and his followers were accused of treason, and Eva Perón's remains were moved secretly to Italy and buried in a graveyard at Milan under a fake identity. Public references to Perón or his late wife, including songs, writings and pictures, were forbidden. Even sportsmen like Delfo Cabrera, Mary Terán de Weiss, many of the major basketball players, as well as Olympic-level athlete, Osvaldo Suárez, were unfairly punished, by being accused of having gotten their sports success only because they were Perón followers.

The Peronist Party suffered a proscription that was to last until Perón's return in 1973, even though Perón influenced the results of the 1958 and 1963 elections from his exile in Madrid.

References

Bibliography

Online Sources 
  Peronismo.
  Historia Argentina: Los gobiernos de Perón.
  Sucesos Históricos Argentinos.
  Civiles y militares de 1955 a 1983.
  La Revolución Libertadora en Internet 
  16 de septiembre de 1955 – Golpe autodenominado “Revolución Libertadora”

Further reading 
 Potash, Robert A. (1980) The Army and Politics in Argentina, 1945–1962: Peron to Frondizi Stanford, California: Stanford University Press, 

1950s coups d'état and coup attempts
1955 in Argentina
1956 in Argentina
1957 in Argentina
1958 in Argentina
Anti-Peronism
Conflicts in 1955
History of Argentina (1955–1973)
July 1955 events in South America
June 1955 events in South America 
August 1955 events in South America
September 1955 events in South America 
Military coups in Argentina
Military dictatorships
Revolutions in Argentina
Counter-revolutionaries